Born to Fight (aka Nato per combattere) is a 1989 action film, starring Brent Huff, John van Dreelen, Werner Pochath and Mary Stavin. The film was shot in the Philippines due to low budget in 1988 and is the third time − after Strike Commando 2 (1988) and Cop Game (1988) − when Brent Huff worked with director Bruno Mattei.

Plot
Super tough Vietnam War veteran Sam Wood (Huff) is a survivor of a vicious prison camp where he was brutally and painfully tortured before finally managing to escape. When Wood returns to rescue his friends, he finds that they are already dead. Some time later a woman named Maryline Kane (Stavin) offers him a tremendous amount of money if he will accompany her back to the area where the prison camp was to do interviews for a documentary story. It all turns out to be a lie − her father is now a prisoner in the camp, and she knows that only a man like Wood can help set him free. Sam adopts a proposal, but the situation is much more complicated, because the camp is now run by his old nemesis Duan Loc (Pochath).

Cast
 Brent Huff as Sam Wood
 Werner Pochath as Duan Loc
 Romano Puppo as Alex Bross
 John van Dreelen as Gen. Weber
 Mary Stavin as Maryline Kane
 Don Wilson (IV) as Gen. Weber's Aide
 Claudio Fragasso (as Clyde Anderson) as one of the prisoners

External links
 
 Born to Fight at Variety Distribution

References

1989 action films
1989 films
1980s English-language films
1980s Italian-language films
Films directed by Bruno Mattei
Macaroni Combat films
Films shot in the Philippines
1989 multilingual films
Italian multilingual films
1980s Italian films